Scotland School District was a school district headquartered in Scotland, an unincorporated area in Van Buren County, Arkansas.

In the 2000s the Scotland high school building, listed on the Arkansas Historical Register since December 6, 2000 and dedicated on March 26, 1926, was the oldest in use in the state.

On July 1, 2004, the Scotland district consolidated with the Alread School District into the existing Clinton School District.

References

Further reading
These include maps of predecessor districts:
 (Download)

External links
 
 Scotland School District No. 4 Van Buren County, Arkansas General Purpose Financial Statements and Other Reports June 30, 2001

Education in Van Buren County, Arkansas
School districts disestablished in 2004
2004 disestablishments in Arkansas
Defunct school districts in Arkansas